The Terceira Divisão Portuguesa (in English: Portuguese Third Division) was a football league in Portugal, situated at the fourth level of the Portuguese football league system. The Third Division was initially the third level of the Portuguese pyramid but with the creation of the Segunda Liga in 1990–91, it became the fourth level. The competition merged with the Segunda Divisão at the end of the 2012–13 to form a new enlarged third-level league, the Campeonato Nacional de Seniores.

Competition 
The Terceira Divisão was established in 1948 and in its last season had 7 Sections with the Championship of each being divided into two phases. 

The 6 Sections (A, B, C, D, E, F) within Mainland Portugal each had 12 teams and played 22 matches in the first phase. This was followed by the second phase where the top 6 teams in each section competed in the Promotion Group and played 10 matches to determine the champion teams from each Group that would be promoted to the Segunda Divisão. The last 6 teams in each Section competed in the Relegation Group and played 10 matches to determine the last 3 teams to be relegated to the District Leagues.

In the Azores Section there were 10 teams that played 18 matches in the first phase. This was followed by the second phase where the top 4 teams in the Section competed in the Promotion Group and played 6 matches to determine the champion team that would be promoted to Segunda Divisão. However, limitations were placed on promotion to the Segunda Divisão dependent upon the position of the 6 teams from Azores competing in the Second Division Championship. If no teams from Azores finished in a relegation position in Second Division then the lowest-placed team played a two-leg play-off with the winners of the Third Division Azores Section to determine the remaining team from Azores that would compete in the Second Division. The last 6 teams in the Section competed in the Relegation Group and played 10 matches to determine the last 3 teams to be relegated to the District Leagues.

Seasons - League Tables

List of champions

Third-tier league: 1947–1990

Fourth-tier league: 1990–2013

Titles
4 titles: Benfica e Castelo Branco, Bragança
3 titles: Montijo,  União de Lamas, Caldas, Lusitânia
2 titles: Almada, Seixal, Cova da Piedade, Vizela, Lusitânia Lourosa, União de Santarém, Portalegrense, Vasco da Gama, Vila Real, Estarreja, Atlético CP, Paredes, Louletano, Juventude de Évora, Anadia, Casa Pia, Madalena, Mirandela, Amarante, Monsanto, Estrela de Vendas Novas, Angrense, Praiense
1 title:  Ovarense, Lusitano VRSA,  Coruchense, O Elvas, Serpa, Oliveirense, Beira-Mar, Varzim, Os Leões,  União de Tomar, Olhanense, Caldas, Paços de Ferreira, Rio Ave, Sacavenense, União de Coimbra, Esperança de Lagos, Desportivo das Aves, Estrela de Portalegre, Campinense, Mirense, Trofense, Odivelas, Limianos, Desportivo de Beja, Fafe, Dragões Sandinenses, Vilafranquense, Vianense,  Caçadores das Taipas, Oliveira do Hospital, Olivais e Moscavide, Amora, Mafra, Lixa, Alcaíns, Sintrense, Pinhalnovense, Santo António, Valenciano, Ribeirão, Penalva do Castelo, Operário, Os Sandinenses, Aliados de Lordelo, Nelas, Portomosense, Benfica B, Silves, Maria da Fonte, Vila Meã, Eléctrico, Valdevez, Leça, Caniçal, Lagoa, Arouca, Oriental, Mineiro Aljustrelense, Vieira, Tondela, Sertanense, Camacha, Vitória do Pico, Macedo de Cavaleiros, Oliveirense, Coimbrões, Andorinha, Cinfães, Ribeira Brava, Cesarense, Académico de Viseu, Futebol Benfica, Farense, Pontassolense, Felgueiras 1932, Grijó, Sourense, Lourinhanense, União de Montemor, Joane

References 

     
3
Defunct third level football leagues in Europe
Defunct fourth level football leagues in Europe